"Morning Has Broken" is a Christian hymn first published in 1931. It has words by English author Eleanor Farjeon and was inspired by the village of Alfriston in East Sussex, then set to a traditional Scottish Gaelic tune, "Bunessan". It is often sung in children's services and in funeral services.

English pop musician and folk singer Cat Stevens included a version on his album Teaser and the Firecat (1971). The song became identified with Stevens due to the popularity of this recording. It reached number six on the U.S. Billboard Hot 100, number one on the U.S. easy listening chart in 1972, and number four on the Canadian RPM magazine charts.

Origins
The hymn originally appeared in the second edition of Songs of Praise (published in 1931), to the tune "Bunessan", composed in the Scottish Islands. In Songs of Praise Discussed, the editor, Percy Dearmer, explains that as there was need for a hymn to give thanks for each day, English poet and children's author Eleanor Farjeon had been "asked to make a poem to fit the lovely Scottish tune." A slight variation on the original hymn, also written by Eleanor Farjeon, can be found in the form of a poem contributed to the anthology Children's Bells, under Farjeon's new title, "A Morning Song (For the First Day of Spring)", published by Oxford University Press in 1957. The song is noted in  time but with a  feel.

After appearing in Lachlan MacBean's Songs and Hymns of the Gael, "Bunessan" was used in the Revised Church Hymnary (1927) and the Appendix (1936) to the Irish Church Hymnal (1919) paired with the nativity text "Child in the Manger" by the Scottish poet Mary MacDonald (1789–1872), who lived on the Isle of Mull and was born there, near the village of Bunessan, for which the tune is named. The tune is also used for the James Quinn hymns "Christ Be Beside Me" and "This Day God Gives Me", both of which were adapted from the traditional Irish hymn "St. Patrick's Breastplate". Michael Saward's hymn "Baptized In Water" also uses the tune.

Cat Stevens recording

Cat Stevens' recording, with piano arranged and performed by Rick Wakeman, led to international recognition of the song.

When shaping "Morning Has Broken" for recording, Stevens started with the hymn, which took around 45 seconds to sing in its basic form. Producer Paul Samwell-Smith told him he could never put something like that on an album, and that it had to be at least three minutes, though an acoustic demo of an early Stevens version lasts almost three minutes.  Prior to the actual recording Stevens heard Wakeman play something in the recording booth. It was a rough sketch of what would later become "Catherine Howard". Stevens told Wakeman that he liked it and wanted something similar as the opening section, the closing section and, if possible, a middle section as well. Wakeman told Stevens he could not as it was his piece destined for a solo album, but Stevens persuaded him to adapt his composition. The single reached number nine on the UK Singles Chart and number six on the US Billboard Hot 100, becoming Stevens's most successful single on the latter chart (later tied by his rendition of "Another Saturday Night").

In 2000, Wakeman released an instrumental version of "Morning Has Broken" on an album of the same title. That same year he gave an interview on BBC Radio 5 Live in which he said he had agreed to perform on the Cat Stevens track for £10 and was "shattered" that he was omitted from the credits, adding that he never received the money either.

On his return to performance as Yusuf Islam, Stevens paid Wakeman and apologized for the original non-payment, which he said arose from confusion and misunderstanding by the record label. On a documentary aired on British television, Wakeman stated that he felt Stevens's version of "Morning Has Broken" was a very beautiful piece of music that had brought people closer to religious truth, for which he expressed satisfaction in having contributed. Wakeman included a 3:42 version on his 2017 album of piano arrangements, Piano Portraits.

The Stevens arrangement changes key four times, with the first, second, and fourth verses of the song in C major, while the instrumental introduction, third verse, and the instrumental ending are in D major.

Chart history

Weekly charts

Year-end charts

Other versions
The song has been recorded by many other artists, including The New Seekers, Judith Durham, Steven Curtis Chapman, Judy Collins, Michael Card, Floyd Cramer, Dana, Neil Diamond, Órla Fallon, Art Garfunkel, Ellen Greene, Esther Ofarim, Daliah Lavi, Joe Longthorne, Jojje Wadenius and Anni-Frid Lyngstad (2010), the Mormon Tabernacle Choir, Nana Mouskouri, Aaron Neville, Kenny Rogers and the First Edition, Joseph McManners, Sister Janet Mead, Mary O'Hara, Demis Roussos, Third Day, The Brilliance, Pam Tillis, Hayley Westenra, Roger Whittaker, 2nd Chapter of Acts, Libera (choir), Richard Souther and Dana Winner. A version by Isleville Symphonette reached No. 24 in the Canadian AC charts.

The song has been translated into German ("Schön ist der Morgen", performed by Nana Mouskouri, and by Jürgen Henkys "Morgenlicht leuchtet" and included in the hymnal of the German Protestant Lutheran Church, Evangelisches Gesangbuch, under Nr. 455, and also in the hymnal of the Protestant (Reformed) Church of Switzerland, RG (reformiertes Gesangbuch), under Nr. 533. Also, the song has been translated into French ("Matin brisé", performed by Eva on her 1972 album L'orage), Dutch (Licht Op De Lakes performed by Rowwen Hèze) and other languages.

See also
List of number-one adult contemporary singles of 1972 (U.S.)
Christian child's prayer § Morning Prayer

References

External links

1972 singles
Anni-Frid Lyngstad songs
Cat Stevens songs
English Christian hymns
English children's songs
Island Records singles
Song recordings produced by Paul Samwell-Smith
20th-century hymns